Toivo Timoteus Kuula (7 July 1883 – 18 May 1918) was a Finnish composer and conductor of the late-Romantic and early-modern periods, who emerged in the wake of Jean Sibelius, under whom he studied privately from 1906 to 1908. The core of Kuula's oeuvre are his many works for voice and orchestra, in particular the Stabat mater (1914–18; completed by Madetoja), The Sea-Bathing Maidens (1910), Son of a Slave (1910), and The Maiden and the Boyar's Son (1912). In addition he also composed two Ostrobothnian Suites for orchestra and left an unfinished symphony at the time of his murder in 1918 in a drunken quarrel.

Life and career 
He was born in the Vehkakoski village of the Alavus town and registered as a native in the city of Vaasa (then Nikolainkaupunki), when Finland still was a Grand Duchy under Russian rule. He is known as a colorful and passionate portrayer of Finnish nature and people.

Kuula became Jean Sibelius's first composition student. He is best remembered for his large output of melodic choir and vocal works. His instrumental works include two Ostrobothnian Suites for orchestra, a violin sonata, a piano trio, and an unfinished Symphony. Kuula's major choral work is often considered the cantata Stabat Mater, which was completed in spring 1915 (original version, later lost) but revised, beginning 1917 and unfinished at the time of his death. He also wrote a few dozen highly artistic piano works, and 24 songs, many of them first performed by his wife, the singer Alma Kuula.

Kuula has been considered an even more talented composer than his teacher Sibelius.

A Swedish critic once said that Kuula's music reaches parts of the human spirit where one is forced to deep examination of one's self.

Kuula was known to be a fierce Fennoman. He died in the provincial hospital in Viipuri in 1918 after being mortally wounded 18 days earlier on Walpurgis Night by a bullet fired by a Jäger. The bullet was fired as a result of a quarrel that happened at the Hotel Seurahuone in conjunction with the first victory celebration of the White victory in the Civil War of Finland. Ironically, "Kuula" means "bullet" in Finnish. Kuula is buried in Hietaniemi cemetery, Helsinki.

Toivo Kuula married Alma Silventoinen in 1914; the couple had one daughter, Sinikka, who later became a professional pianist.

Compositions
A simplified works list (by Joel Valkila) on the basis of Tero Tommila's Catalogue of Works:
 Op. 1 Violin Sonata
 Op. 2 Five Songs for Voice and Piano (also arranged as chamber works)
 Op. 3a Five Pieces for Violin and Piano: I. Cradle Song, II. Nocturne, III. Folk Song (I), IV. Folk Song (II), V. Scherzino
 Op. 3b Three Piano Works: I. Elegy, II. Wedding March, III. Little Gavotte
 Op. 3c Incidental Music to "Isä ja Tytär"
 Op. 4 Seven Songs for Male Choir
 Op. 5 Festive March for Chorus and Orchestra (or Brass)

 Op. 6 Two Songs for Voice and Piano
 Op. 7 Piano Trio
 Op. 8 Two Songs for Voice and Piano
 Op. 9 Ostrobothnian Suite No.1 for Orchestra: I. Pastorale, II. Folk Song, III. Ostrobothnian Dance, IV. Devil's Dance, V. Song of the Dusk (II. & III. also as arranged for Violin and Piano)
 Op. 10 Prelude and Fugue for Orchestra

 Op.11 Seven Songs for Chorus
 Op.12 'Merenkylpijäneidot' ("Sea-Bathing Maids") for Voice and Orchestra/Piano
 Op.13 Festive March for Orchestra/Piano
 Op.14 'Orjan poika' ("Son of a Slave") – Symphonic Legend for Soprano, Baritone, Chorus and Orchestra (also 3-movement Suite for Orchestra)
 Op.15 Cantata 'Kuolemattomuuden toivo' ("Hope for Immortality")

 Op.16a Two Songs for Voice and Piano
 Op.16b Two Pieces for Organ: I. Prelude, II. Intermezzo
 Op.17a South Ostrobothnian Dance Suites I & II for Violin and Piano
 Op.17b Twelve South Ostrobothnian Folk Dances for Voice/Violin and Piano
 Op.17c Two Pieces for Violin and Piano: I. Scherzo, II. Melodia lugubre
 Op.18 'Impi ja pajarin poika' ("The Maiden and the Son of a Blacksmith") for Voice and Orchestra/Piano
 Op.19 Three Fairy-Tale Pictures for Piano
 Op.20 Ostrobothnian Suite No.2 for Orchestra: I. Tulopeli, II. Rain in the Forest, III. Menuet, IV. Dance of the Orphans, V. The Devils Making Magic Flames

 Op.21 Three Songs for Chorus
 Op.22/1-2 Two Pieces for Cello and Orchestra: I. Chanson sans paroles, II. Elegy (Suru)
 Op.22/1-2 Two Pieces for Violin/Cello and Piano: I. Chanson sans paroles, II. Elegy (Suru)
 Op.22/3 Song for Voice and Piano
 Op.23 Four Songs for Voice and Piano
 Op.24 Four Songs for Voice and Piano
 Op.25 Stabat Mater for Chorus and Orchestra (Note: Not left unfinished as has been stated)

 Op.26 Six Piano Pieces: I. Round Dance, II. Pastorale Atmosphere, III. Dance Improvisation, IV. Nocturne, V. Rauha (Adagio), VI. Funeral March
 Op.27a Eight Songs for Male Choir
 Op.27b Nine Songs for Male Choir
 Op.28/1-2 Two Pieces for Brass Orchestra: I. At the Mountain, II. A Tune
 Op.28/4 March of the Cudgelmen for Choir and Orchestra (or a capella)
 Op.29a Three Songs for Voice and Piano
 Op.29b Four Songs for Choir
 Op.29c Two Songs for Male Choir
 Op.30a Incidental Music to 'Kandaules' 
 Op.30b Incidental Music to 'Medicit' 
 Op.30c Incidental Music to 'Taikapeili' ("The Magic Mirror")

 Op.31a Two Songs for Voice and Orchestra/Piano
 Op.31b Four Songs for Choir
 Op.32 Incidental Music to 'Meripoikia' ("The Sea Boys")
 Op.33 March of the Carburetors for Piano [unfinished]
 Op.34a Seven Songs for Male Choir
 Op.34b Three Songs for Chorus
 Op.35 Three Songs Arrangements for Voice and Orchestra

 Op.36 Symphony [unfinished]: Introduction
 Op.37 Two Song Transcriptions for Piano

+ Six Posthumous Piano Pieces (Two unfinished)
+ Six Posthumous Orchestral Pieces (Two unfinished)
+ Twenty-Two Posthumous Chamber Pieces (Five unfinished)
+ Fourteen Songs (Three unfinished)
+ One Posthumous Cantata

Selected recordings
 Complete Works for Solo Piano. Adam Johnson. Grand Piano GP780 (2018)
 Finnish Songs. Kirsi Tiihonen, Satu Salminen. Marco Polo 8.225177 (2004)
 Orchestral Suites. Turku Philharmonic Orchestra, Leif Segerstam. Ondine ODE1270-2 (2015)
 Orjan poika. Suomen Laula Choir, Finnish Radio Symphony Orchestra. Jussi Jalas. Broadcast on BBC Radio 3, 23 August 2018
 Piano Trio in A Major. Kreeta-Julia Heikkilä, Tuomas Lehto, Roope Gröndahl. YouTube.
 Songs and Orchestral Music. Susan Gritton, BBC Concert Orchestra, Martyn Brabbins. Dutton Epoch CDLX 7272 (2011)
 Violin Sonatas. Nina Karmon, Oliver Triendl. CPO 555 148-2 (2018)

References

External links

Collected Solo Songs published by Edition Tilli Ltd.
The Toivo Kuula Society
FIMIC Articles on Kuula
 Toivo Kuula syntyi Alavudella saunassa 

 

1883 births
1918 deaths
People from Vaasa
People from Vaasa Province (Grand Duchy of Finland)
Finnish classical composers
Finnish conductors (music)
20th-century classical composers
Pupils of Jean Sibelius
People of the Finnish Civil War (White side)
Finnish murder victims
People murdered in Finland
Deaths by firearm in Finland
Finnish male classical composers
Burials at Hietaniemi Cemetery
20th-century conductors (music)
20th-century male musicians
Fennomans
20th-century Finnish composers